Sidi Moussa is a village in the rural commune Karmet Ben Salem, Meknès Prefecture, Fès-Meknès region of Morocco. There are 63 people who lived there according to the 2004 official census.

History
During the Roman Empire the village was the site of a castra that housed a cohort of Parthian troupes. The castra was one of five in the area that guarded the nearby city of Volubilis from incursion from over the nearby Limes Africanus.

References

populated places in Meknès Prefecture